Guru Sishyan is a 2010 Tamil-language action comedy film directed by Sakthi Chidambaram. It stars Sathyaraj and Sundar C. in the lead roles. The title was taken from the 1988 film of the same name.

Plot
Guru (Sathyaraj) is a slimy moneylender in Rajapalayam, whom everybody including his assistants (Raj Kapoor) hates him. Eeti (Sundar C.) a smart alec soon becomes his constant companion. The pair gang up and virtually take the town over with their boorish and aggressive ways including humiliating Mahalakshmi (Saranya), at any given opportunity.

There is a constant tug of war between Guru and Mahalakshmi who we are told through regular flashbacks were husband and wife who fell out over Guru's sister's suicide. At the interval point it is revealed that Eeti is Mahalakshmi's long lost brother whose mission in life is to unite the estranged couple.

Cast

 Sathyaraj as Guru Moorthy
 Sundar C. as Eeti
 Shruti Marathe as Gayathri
 Saranya Ponvannan as Mahalakshmi
 Santhanam
 Raj Kapoor
 Ponnambalam
 Vichu Vishwanath
 Singamuthu
 Aarthi
 Pattimandram Raja
 Shakeela
 Kovai Senthil
 Kiran Rathod (Item number)
 Namitha as Anitha (Cameo role)

Soundtrack

The music was composed By Dhina and released by Saregama.

Reception
Sify wrote "Strictly for those who love double entendre, crude comedy, skin show and item numbers, flying kicks and have more than two and a half hours to spare". Behindwoods wrote "The storyline is nothing new and it rides on a very predictable path. [..] There are no twists and turns and the movie travels on a beaten path". Rediff wrote "The problem is, there's nothing in the least respectable about the movie. You can enjoy a well-paced potpourri that at least tries to entertain everyone, but there's little to the credit of a film that seriously tests the boundaries of vulgarity and makes you squirm in your seat with embarrassment".

References

External links 
 

2010 films
Indian action comedy films
Films set in Tamil Nadu
2010s Tamil-language films
2010 action comedy films
Films directed by Sakthi Chidambaram